The International Council of Universities of Saint Thomas Aquinas (Spanish: Consejo Internacional de Universidades Santo Tomás de Aquino) is a world-wide network of universities inspired by the thought of St. Thomas Aquinas. Generally known as ICUSTA, it promotes academic exchange between students,  professors and researchers. ICUSTA unites some 23 universities, with over 200,000 students on the five continents.

Mission
ICUSTA has as its main mission, to unite all the Catholic universities based on the intellectual, pedagogical and methodologic principles of Thomism, the thought of Saint Thomas Aquinas, in order to create and to integrate university policies.  This takes the form of  increasing the interchange between students and professors, the development of joint plans between the various institutions and the sharing of information and programs.

History
ICUSTA grew out of a meeting in 1993 between representatives of the University of St. Thomas (Houston) and Universidad Santo Tomás, Chile.  They were soon joined by the Pontifical University of Saint Thomas Aquinas, Angelicum in Rome, and the Universidad Santo Tomás, Colombia.  In 1995 in Rome, a second conference was held which was attended by 12  universities.  There a permanent international organization was established with bylaws and protocols for the accomplishment of the ICUSTA mission.

In the successive conferences additional members were added. The later meetings were in Manila, in  1997; in Fredericton, New Brunswick, Canada, in 1999; in Rome, in 2001; in Mar del Plata, Argentina, in 2003; and in Barcelona, Spain, in 2005, Australian Catholic University in Melbourne, Australia (2007), and Mary Immaculate College in Limerick, Ireland (2009).

ICUSTA returned to the Pontifical and Royal University of Santo Tomás in the Philippines in 2011 to commemorate the 400th anniversary of the founding of this great university in 1611. In 2013, the conference will be held in France at the Catholic Institute of Higher Studies - ICES. In 2015, ICUSTA hold its biennial meeting for the first time in Africa at the University of St. Thomas of Mozambique for the 12th Biennial.

Members

See also
List of institutions named after Thomas Aquinas

External links

 ICUSTA official webpage;
 ICUSTA 2013 - 11th biennial conference
 “El rector de la universidad Fasta visitó al rey Juan Carlos I”, La Capital, El diario de Mar del Plata, 13 May 2005 about the Barcelona Conference, in Spanish;

Lists of Catholic universities and colleges